Interface Design is the description of how systems or components connect in systems engineering.

Interface design may also refer to:

 User interface design, designing a method for humans to interact with machines
 the design of an interface (computing)
 the design of an interface (object-oriented programming)